Francis North (1811 – 9 December 1864) was a Member of the Queensland Legislative Council.

North was appointed to the Queensland Legislative Council on the 3 July 1863 and served until his death on the 9 Dec 1864. He was buried in Ipswich General Cemetery.

References

Members of the Queensland Legislative Council
1811 births
1864 deaths
Burials at Ipswich General Cemetery
19th-century Australian politicians